John Gonçalves MBE is a Gibraltarian politician, who served as Mayor of Gibraltar from 4 April 2019 to 1 June 2021. Prior to this, he was chairman of the Gibraltar Police Authority, from 2013 to 2018.

Early life 
Gonçalves had lived in Portugal with his Gibraltarian mother for a time, returning to Gibraltar after the death of his father.

Pre-Mayoral career 
Gonçalves has a civil service background. Having been a member of the Gibraltar Sports Advisory Committee since 1972, Gonçalves became President of the Gibraltar Amateur Basketball Association in 1984, a position he still holds as of 2019. He became a member of the board of FIBA Europe in 2003, and its vice president in 2010. Gonçalves served as General Manager of Gibraltar Airport Services from 1989 to 1992, Chairman of Terminal Management Ltd from 1992 to 2011. In 2007 he was appointed as a Member of the British Empire. In 2013 he was voted chairman of the Gibraltar Police Authority, a role he held until 2018.

Mayor of Gibraltar 
On 4 April 2019 Gonçalves was invested Mayor of Gibraltar, succeeding Kaiane Aldorino. At this ceremony he was called "Mr Basketball" by Chief Minister Fabian Picardo, noting that this was the same year Gibraltar would be hosting the 2019 Island Games.

During his mayoralty, he was selected as one of three Vice Presidents of FIBA Europe.

References 

Mayors of Gibraltar
Basketball in Gibraltar
Year of birth missing (living people)
Living people